The Financial Review Rich List 2020 is the 37th annual survey of the 200 wealthiest people resident in Australia, published by The Australian Financial Review in The Australian Financial Review Magazine on 30 October 2020. 

The net worth of the wealthiest individual, Gina Rinehart, was 28.89 billion; while the net worth of the 200th wealthiest individual, Nigel Satterley, was 540 million; up from 472 million for the 200th individual in 2019. The combined wealth of the 200 individuals was calculated as 424 bn, an increase of 72 bn on the previous year; compared with a combined wealth of 6.4 bn in 1984 when the BRW Rich 200 commenced. The list included nineteen debutants, including three of Rinehart's children.

Rinehart held the mantle of Australia's wealthiest individual between 2011 and 2015; peaking in 2012, when her net worth was assessed at 29.17 bn. From 2017 to 2019, Anthony Pratt was Australia's wealthiest individual, ranked third in the 2020 Rich List, after Andrew Forrest , Australia's wealthiest individual in 2008. Harry Triguboff  was Australia's wealthiest individual in 2016, ranked seventh in the 2020 Rich List.

List of individuals 

{| class="wikitable"
!colspan="2"|Legend
|-
! Icon
! Description
|-
|
|Has not changed from the previous year's list
|-
|
|Has increased from the previous year's list
|-
|
|Has decreased from the previous year's list
|}

Removed from the 2019 list 
The following individuals, who appeared on the 2019 Financial Review Rich List, did not appear on the 2020 list:

Notes 
: Individual was listed on a previous year's list, that was not the 2019 Rich List.

See also
 Financial Review Rich List
 Forbes Asia list of Australians by net worth

References

External links 

2020 in Australia
2020